Joy Henderson is a Toronto-based Black writer and anti-racism activist.

Early life 
Henderson was born in 1978 and grew up in the Regent Park area of Toronto.

She is Black.

Activism and career 
She works as a child and youth care practitioner.

She quit from the New Democratic Party in 2021, after reporting on their racist actions towards a black  candidate.

In 2022, she was critical of the Ottawa Police Service for their lack of action of the Canada convoy protesters, in contrast to more robust action from police in the context of Indigenous protestors. Following the publication of her writing in the Toronto Star, she received death threats and racist comments.

Selected publications 

 Joy Henderson (2020) Hiding and Being Found: How Inequity Found Its Spotlight during COVID-19 and What It Means for the Future, Child & Youth Services, 41:3, 256-258,

Family life 
Henderson has three children.

References 

Living people
Writers from Toronto
Activists from Toronto
Canadian anti-racism activists
Year of birth missing (living people)
Black Canadian writers